Lynn Kanuka-Williams ( Kanuka; born July 11, 1960) is a Canadian athlete from Regina, Saskatchewan. She competed in 3000m races, as well as a smaller number of 1500m races.

She competed for Canada at the 1984 Summer Olympics held in Los Angeles, U.S. in the 3,000 metres where she won the bronze medal (in the race notable for the incident between Mary Decker and Zola Budd).  Four years later in Seoul, South Korea she finished fifth in the 1500 metres.
Additionally, she collected a bronze medal at the 1989 World Cross Country championships.

Achievements

See also
 Canadian records in track and field

References

External links
 
 
 
 
 
 

1960 births
Living people
Canadian female middle-distance runners
Olympic bronze medalists for Canada
Athletes (track and field) at the 1984 Summer Olympics
Athletes (track and field) at the 1988 Summer Olympics
Athletes (track and field) at the 1986 Commonwealth Games
Olympic track and field athletes of Canada
Athletes from Regina, Saskatchewan
Medalists at the 1984 Summer Olympics
World Athletics Championships athletes for Canada
Commonwealth Games gold medallists for Canada
Commonwealth Games bronze medallists for Canada
Commonwealth Games medallists in athletics
Olympic bronze medalists in athletics (track and field)
Universiade medalists in athletics (track and field)
Universiade bronze medalists for Canada
20th-century Canadian women
Medallists at the 1986 Commonwealth Games